Ashleigh Ross aka Ashi Ross is an Australian actress, dancer and model.

Ross was born and raised in Sydney, Australia. Although she mainly spent her time in dance, she loved to model and act and at age five she landed a two-page spread in Parents (magazine) Australia.

At age nine, Ashleigh was cast as "May" in ABC mini series My Place (TV series) at age ten she appeared as "Okinawa" in Spirited (series 1) and then the role most recognised for "Scout" in Dance Academy (Episodes).

At the age of 14, Ashleigh designed, created and launched her first Dance Wear Line, released in 2014 in conjunction with "Energetiks" Dancewear and then on the success of that created a second line in 2016.

In 2015 she was endorsed by Dance Company Ballet is Fun to promote their product Turn board and toured the US and UK dancing and promoting her very own signed Gold Turnboard.

Major theatre roles she has played are lead child "Jane Banks" in Disney's and Cameron Mackintosh's Mary Poppins (Musical) in Sydney, Australia and "Jemima Potts" In Tim Lawsons Chitty Chitty Bang Bang (Musical) Capital Theatre Sydney Sydney.

Filmography

Television

Feature Film

Awards

References

External links
 
 

Living people
Australian television actresses
Australian female dancers
Australian female models
Year of birth missing (living people)